In the Massacre of Schletz, more than 200 Neolithic people were killed by blunt force 7000 years ago (5000 BC), towards the end of the Linear Pottery culture epoch, before being carelessly dumped in a mass grave on the site of the present-day village of Schletz (municipality of Asparn an der Zaya in Lower Austria).

Excavation 
The Linear Pottery settlement area of Schletz, about 50 kilometers north of Vienna, was discovered on the basis of aerial archaeological features and archaeologically investigated between 1983 and 2005. The settlement was enclosed by an oval ditch, which was double in sections and can be interpreted as a fortification. The oval ditch had a width of up to four meters, a depth of two meters, and a longitudinal diameter of 330 meters. Several earth bridges provided access to the interior of the settlement, where the ground plans of at least 12 longhouses have been traced.

Findings 
In the course of the excavations, which covered about 20 percent of the site, the skeletons of about 200 individuals were discovered in the outer trench, most of whom died as a result of severe injuries to their skulls caused by blunt force (with shoe-last celts), and in one case also by arrow shot. The trenches remained open for some time, so that the position of some corpses was altered by animals. The dead - men, women and children - had mostly been laid in prone position, in many examined skeletons arms or legs were missing, also severed skulls were found separately. It was remarkable that there were hardly any young women among the dead. Probably all inhabitants were killed or captured during an attack on the settlement; after that the settlement area was no longer inhabited.

According to the findings, all the dead were laid down about 7000 years ago. The massacre of Schletz consequently occurred at the same time as the massacres at Kilianstädten (Hesse) and Talheim (Baden-Württemberg).

References 

Mass graves
Massacres in Europe
Linear Pottery culture